Nothodiplax is a genus of dragonfly in the family Libellulidae. It contains only one species,  Nothodiplax dendrophila, known as the canopy skimmer.

References

Libellulidae
Anisoptera genera
Taxonomy articles created by Polbot